Kara A. Pryor (born 2 April 1991) is a New Zealand rugby union player who currently plays as a loose forward for Rugby New York (Ironworkers) of Major League Rugby (MLR) in the U.S.

Senior career
He debuted for the Taniwha at the start of the 2014 season and instantly became an important member of their side, forming a strong loose forward combination along with his brother as well as  international Jack Ram.

Pryor's first season with Northland was a successful one for the Taniwha who are traditionally known as one of New Zealand's weaker provinces. They finished 3rd on the Championship table with Pryor appearing in all 11 of their games during the season and contributing 1 try. Just over half of his appearances in 2014 were from the start, but by 2015, he was firmly established as one of the first names on the teamsheet, playing 10 times, 9 times from the start and once from the bench in what was a tough season for Northland which saw them finish bottom of the Championship with no wins. 2016 saw a rise in performances for the Taniwha but with little to show for it in terms of results, only 1 win in 10 games again confined them to the Championship wooden spoon, Pryor however, was in fine form. Held back by injury in the early part of the year, he still managed 7 appearances, all from the start and 1 try.

Super Rugby
Fine form domestically for Auckland and later Northland brought Pryor to the attention of local Super Rugby franchise, the Blues. He played for their development side in 2014 and 2015 and also provided injury cover during the 2015 season. He was named as part of their senior squad for the first time ahead of the 2016 Super Rugby season. On a personal note, his first season of Super Rugby went well as he featured in 13 of the Blues 15 games and scored 2 tries. The majority of his appearances in his first season came from the replacements bench as he faced stiff competition from the other Blues loose forwards such as All Blacks; Jerome Kaino and Steve Luatua.

International
In October 2016 Pryor, who affiliates to the Ngāti Awa, Ngāti Pikiao, and Ngāti Rangitihi iwi, was named in the Māori All Blacks squad for their end of year tour to the Northern Hemisphere.

References

1991 births
Living people
New Zealand rugby union players
Rugby union flankers
Northland rugby union players
Auckland rugby union players
Blues (Super Rugby) players
Ngāti Awa people
Ngāti Pikiao people
Ngāti Rangitihi people
Māori All Blacks players
Sunwolves players
Rugby New York players